Abimilki (Amorite: , LÚa-bi-mil-ki) around 1347 BC held the rank of Prince of Tyre (called "Surru" in the letters), during the period of the Amarna letters correspondence (1350–1335 BC). He is the author of ten letters to the Egyptian pharaoh, EA 146–155 (EA for 'el Amarna'). In letter EA 147, Pharaoh Akhenaten confirmed him as ruler of Tyre upon the death of his father, and in EA 149, referred to him with the rank of rabisu (general).

Abimilki is not referenced by name in any other letters of the 382-letter corpus. His name has been linked with the biblical Abimelech. His name means "My father (is) king."

Historical background
Following the request of Akhenaten to disseminate his political updates in Kinaha, some other city states rebelled against this decision. The background was the vacancy in the position of rabisu in the garrison of Tyre, which Akhenaten staffed with non-Egyptians for organizational reasons. Eventually, as in letter EA 149, Akhenaten conferred the status of rabisu of Tyre upon Abimilki.

Zimredda of Sidon, and Aziru of Amurru, previously allied with Abimilki, responded by conquering Sumuru and occupying the territories around Tyre. Abimilki advised Amenhotep of the dangerous situation in several letters. In letter EA 151 (see here ), Abimilki mentions the Danunans: "Behold, dangerous enemies are besieging Tyre. The king of Danuna is meanwhile dead; his brother now reigns. He behaves peacefully toward me."

Later in the letter, Abimilki warns of the rebels: "Behold, the fort of Tyre is running out of fresh water and wood. I will send you Ilu-milku as a messenger. At present there are no Hittite troops, but Aitakama of Kadesh is together with Aziru in battle against Biryawaza of Damascus. Meanwhile, Zimredda has been reinforced with troops and ships from Aziru; he has besieged me, and it is very dangerous.

Abimilki's letters
The titles of Abimilki's letters are as follows:
EA 146: "Abimilki of Tyre"
EA 147: "A Hymn to the Pharaoh"
EA 148: "The Need of Mainland Tyre"
EA 149: "Neither Water nor Wood" (See Haapi)
EA 150: "Needed: Just One Soldier"
EA 151: "A Report on Canaan" (See external links:letter and Sea Peoples)
EA 152: "A Demand for Recognition"
EA 153: "Ships on Hold"
EA 154: "Orders Carried Out" (See Zimredda (Sidon mayor))
EA 155: "Servant of Mayati" ("Mayati" is a hypocoristicon for Meritaten, Akhenaten's daughter)

Example letters of Abimilki

EA 147, "A Hymn to the Pharaoh"
The topic of "A Hymn to the Pharaoh" is not Zimredda; however, the war of Aziru son or Abdi-Ashirta, the constant lookout, and reporting by Zimredda is addressed at the very end of this letter.

The photo of the external links shows the condition of EA 147, (minus a corner).

See: phrases and quotations. Instead of "seven times and seb times", in 147 the scribe goes far deeper, using "one half of seven times". A partial reference to the prostration formula may be used in the letter middle, when he uses "on my front and on my back".

Zimredda of Sidon is the topic of five of Abimilki's ten letters.

EA 148, "The Need of Mainland Tyre"
Abimilki of Tyre has sent his tribute to Pharaoh who appointed him, and he requests of Pharaoh ten foot soldiers for protection, since his own men have been taken by the king of Sidon. He also mentions that the king of Hazor has gone over to the enemy, the Habiru who are taking over Canaan.

EA 149, "Neither Water nor Wood"
See: Egyptian commissioner Haapi.

EA 151, "A Report on Canaan"
See: external link article/write-up.

EA 154, "Orders Carried Out"
Five of Abimilki's letters concern his neighbor and conflict enemy Zimredda of Sidon. See: Zimredda (Sidon mayor).

EA 153, "Ships on Hold"
See picture: EA 153 (Obverse)

See also
Zimredda (Sidon mayor)
Haapi, Egyptian commissioner

References
Moran, William L. The Amarna Letters. Johns Hopkins University Press, 1987, 1992. (softcover)

External links

Amarna letters (photos)

King of Babylon: 
 EA 9-(Obverse); see: Karaduniyaš

Tushratta:
EA 19-(Obverse), Article, Tushratta
EA 23-(Reverse), with  Black Hieratic; Article-(British Museum); see: Shaushka
EA 28-(Obverse), see: Pirissi and Tulubri
"Alashiya kingdom" letters:
EA 34-(Obverse); see: EA 34
Rib-Hadda letters:
EA 126-(Obverse) ; Article-(Click for larger Picture) ; See: Salhi (region)
Abimilki:

#1: EA 153-(Obverse); Article
#2: EA 153-(Obverse)-2nd; see: Abimilki

Abdi-Tirši:
EA 228-(Obverse)//(228,330,299,245,252), (EA 330, for Šipti-Ba'lu); Article, Pic writeup

Biridiya:
EA 245-(Obverse) EA 245-(Reverse); Article-1; Article-2; Hannathon/Hinnatuna

Labaya:
EA 252-(Obverse), Article, see Labaya

Others:
EA 299-(High Res.)(Obverse); see Yapahu
EA 369-Front/Back-(Click on each); see: Milkilu

Letters

Letter: EA 147
EA 147-(Obverse); Article
Letter: EA 153
#1: EA 153-(Obverse); Article
#2: EA 153-(Obverse)-2nd; Article

Articles
Write-up of Letter EA 151, concerning Zimredda of Sidon-(Sea peoples, Abimilki letter)
 British Museum photo of obverse, (obverse, reverse, & sides are scribed)
Views of all sides, British Museum site

Amarna letter EA 34:  CDLI entry for letter 34, showing first line stating: Message King Land A-La-Ši-iya. (Umma Lugal Kur Alashiya)

Amarna letters writers
Kings of Tyre
14th-century BC rulers
14th-century BC Phoenician people
Phoenicians in the Amarna letters